Muhammad Qudrat-A-Khuda ( – 3 November 1977) was a Bangladeshi organic chemist, educationist and writer. He founded the Bangladesh Council of Scientific and Industrial Research. From 1969 till 1972, he served as the president of the Pakistan Academy of Sciences. After the independence of Bangladesh, as a chairman of the National Education Commission, he published a report named Qudrat-a-Khuda Education Commission Report.

Early life

Born in Margram village of Birbhum district in Bengal Presidency, Qudrat received his early education from the Margram ME High School and Calcutta Woodburn ME School. He passed the matriculation examination from Calcutta Madrasa in 1918 in the first division. In 1924, he obtained the MSc degree in chemistry standing first in first class, from Kolkata Presidency College and was awarded a gold medal for his performance. He received a Premchand Roychand studentship for higher research in chemistry at Calcutta University. He obtained the Doctor of Science in 1929 from London University for his research entitled Stainless Configuration of Multiplanmet Ring.

Career
Qudrat began his career as a lecturer in chemistry at Presidency College in 1931 and was promoted to head of the department in 1936. From 1942 to 1944, he served as the principal of Islamia College in Calcutta. He returned to Presidency College in 1946, becoming the principal of the college for a brief period in 1947. At the same time, he was a fellow and a member of the senate of Calcutta University. After the partition of India, he came to East Bengal (Bangladesh) in 1947 and served as the first director of Public Instruction of the Government of East Pakistan from 1947 to 1949. In 1949, he was appointed scientific adviser to the Ministry of Defence of the Government of Pakistan. He became the chairman of the Secondary Education Board and served from 1952 to 1955 while serving as faculty member at the Karachi University. He was appointed the first director of the East Regional Laboratories of the Pakistan Council of Scientific and Industrial Research in 1955 and established the laboratories in Dhaka. After retirement from directorship in 1966, he was appointed chairman of the 'Kendriya Bangla Unnayan Board' (Central Board for the Development of Bengali).

Qudrat was appointed a visiting professor of chemistry at University of Dhaka in 1975 and served until his death on 3 November 1977.

Contribution
Qudrat's field of specialisation was organic chemistry. He conducted research on herbals, jute, salt, charcoal, soil and minerals. He successfully extracted biochemical elements from local trees and plants for medicinal use. Qudrat and his associates patented 18 scientific inventions. Manufacturing of Partex from jute-stick was his greatest scientific achievement. Manufacturing malt vinegar from the juice of sugarcane and molasses, Rayon from jute and jute-sticks, and paper from jute were his other significant scientific innovations.

Qudrat played an important role in popularising Bengali for scientific practices. As such, he wrote a number of books on science and technology in Bengali including Bigganer Sarash Kahini (Interesting History of Science), Bigganer Bichitra Kahini (Wonderful History of Science), Bigganer Suchana (Origin of Science), Jaiba Rasayan (Organic Chemistry) in four volumes, Purba Pakistaner Shilpa Sambhabana (Industrial Potentiality of East Pakistan), Paramanu Parichiti (An Introduction to the Atom) and Bigganer Pahela Katha (First Word of Science). Two Bengali science magazines Purogami Biggan (Pioneering Science; 1963) and Bigganer Joyjatra (The Victory of Science; 1972) were published under his auspices. He also wrote some religious books including Pabitra Quraner Puti Kotha O Angari Jaoyara (The Holy Sayings of Quran and Angari Jaoyara).

Awards
 Tamgha-e-Pakistan (1973)
 Sitara-e-Imtiaz (1972)
 Ekushey Padak (1976)
 Independence Day Award (1984)

References

1900s births
1977 deaths
People from Birbhum district
Bengali chemists
Bangladeshi chemists
Bengali scientists
Bangladeshi scientists
Academic staff of the University of Karachi
Pakistan Army civilians
Recipients of Sitara-i-Imtiaz
Recipients of the Ekushey Padak
Recipients of the Independence Day Award
Fellows of Bangladesh Academy of Sciences
Fellows of Pakistan Academy of Sciences
Date of birth missing
Aliah University alumni
Alumni of the University of London
University of Calcutta alumni
Presidents of the Pakistan Academy of Sciences